Consolidated Music Corporation was a short-lived American music publishing licensing company formed in early 1920 — initially by seven major music publishers, but eventually six — to handle piano roll licensing. Consolidated and the six remaining firms, all headquartered in New York City, were located within a few blocks of one another. Consolidated and its six corporate sponsors were defendants named in a Sherman Antitrust suit filed August 3, 1920, by the US Justice Department in U.S. District Court for the Southern District of New York. The plaintiff was represented by Henry Anderson Guiler (1877–1938), Assistant U.S. District Attorney.

Sherman Antitrust suit 
United States v. Consolidated Music Corporation, et al. was the first Sherman Antitrust case involving the music publishing industry. The petition was a complaint about monopoly pricing of piano rolls. In particular, the complaint charged that Consolidated had fixed the price charged to piano roll manufacturers for the right to manufacture and sell copyrighted compositions, and also had fixed the price at which those player rolls were sold to the public. The complaint averred that the seven named defendants controlled 80% of copyrighted musical compositions and 95% of player word roll market in the United States. Word rolls, essentially, were piano rolls with the lyrics printed in the margins. Consolidated held the word rights from published music that were printed on word rolls, and imposed a fee for use of those words on the rolls.

The seventh founding firm, Forster Music Publisher, Inc., of Chicago, resigned sometime around March 1920.

Within two weeks of opening in 1920, faced with the likelihood of defeat, Consolidated closed its doors, withdrew the contract, and quickly thereafter, dissolved the corporation. On March 29, 1922, U.S. District Judge Augustus Noble Hand (1869–1954) dismissed the case. The licensing of piano rolls was eventually assigned to the Music Publishers Protective Association.

Still, the licensing strategy endured by individual companies, yet was not highly successful, namely because consumers didn't want to pay extra for the words. By the end of 1920, sales of melody rolls, minus the words, offered by competitors, had done well in comparison to word rolls, which had fallen noticeably. By contrast, in a subset market, there had been an inverse public response with respect to the sale of phonograph records. Recorded dance music, without vocal, sold well, mainly because the public preferred to pay an extra 20 or 25 cents to acquire a roll with the words, along with the melody, permitting its use for dancing (without the words) or vocalizing around the piano (with the words).

Selected personnel 
Jack Bliss (né George Homer Bliss;  1887–1956), a pianist and founding vice-president and general manager of the Consolidated Music Corporation, resigned in April 1920, to work for the Aeolian Company. He resigned when Consolidated withdrew its proposed contract from the music roll manufacturers and turned back the word roll rights to the publications of six of the music publishing firms.  In January 1920, Bliss had left QRS Records, as general manager for the East. to join Consolidated. According to the U.S. Census, Bliss was managing director a hotel in 1930 and 1940, while living in Larchmont, New York. By 1947, Bliss was manager of the Sarasota Terrace Hotel, Sarasota, Florida.

Bliss' son-in-law, George Edward Trafton (1896–1971), married to his daughter Jacqueline (1917–1989), was a former pro football player.

References 

Publishing companies disestablished in 1920
Sheet music publishing companies
Music publishing companies of the United States
Companies based in New York City
Publishing companies established in 1920
1920 establishments in New York (state)
1920 disestablishments in New York (state)
Defunct music companies
American companies disestablished in 1920
American companies established in 1920